Gamst is a surname. Notable people with the name include:
 Andreas Bernhard Gamst (1923–2015), Norwegian politician
 Henrik Gamst (1788–1861), Danish industrialist, politician and landowner
 Morten Gamst Pedersen (born 1981), Norwegian footballer
 Pål Waaktaar Gamst (born 1961), Norwegian musician and songwriter
 Gamst (YouTuber), South Korean YouTuber

See also 
 H. Gamst & H. C. Lund